The Pan American Combined Events Cup (Spanish:  Copa Panamericana de Pruebas Combinadas) is a track and field competition in men's decathlon and women's heptathlon. Organized by the Association of Panamerican Athletics (APA), newly constituted in 2011, it is an annual contest for combined events athletes representing countries in the region. It is typically held in late May or June.

The competition was launched in 2005 as part of the IAAF Combined Events Challenge as NACAC Combined Events Championships, and was initially organized by the North American, Central American and Caribbean Athletic Association (NACAC), with the first edition taking place in San Juan, Puerto Rico. The event was repeated in San Juan the following year and had its third outing in 2007 in Santo Domingo in the Dominican Republic. The size of the competition was expanded in 2008 as it was renamed the Pan American Combined Events Championships with the organization of the event being transferred to the Pan American Athletics Commission, a subdivision of the Pan American Sports Organization (PASO).  It became open to combined events specialists representing any of the countries in the Americas. A record of 40 athletes from 15 countries took part in that edition.

The championships underwent another name change the following year, being held in Havana, Cuba as the Americas Combined Events Cup. Headed by the Cuban Federation President, former Olympic champion Alberto Juantorena, it was incorporated into that year's Barrientos Memorial, Cuba's national track and field championships. No edition was held in 2010 and the event returned under its inaugural moniker for the 2011 season. In the year 2012, the Championships were renamed to its present name.  The inaugural Pan American Combined Events Cup took place in Ottawa, Canada.

Cuba's Yordanis García holds the championship record for the decathlon with his score of 8496 points. The heptathlon best is  points by American Sharon Day. Four athletes have won at the event on two occasions: Maurice Smith of Jamaica, Ryan Harlan of the United States, as well as Yordanis García and Yorgelis Rodríguez of Cuba.

Editions

Records

Medalists

Senior
Key:

Decathlon

Heptathlon

 Nigeria's Uhunoma Osazuwa received a special invitation allowing her to compete as a guest athlete and she finished first in the heptathlon with a score of 6049 points.
 Nigeria's Uhunoma Osazuwa received a special invitation allowing her to compete as a guest athlete and she finished second in the heptathlon with a score of 6008 points.

Junior

Decathlon

Heptathlon

 Katelyn Lehner was 3rd achieving 4879 pts, and Keely Watts-Watling was 4th achieving 4853 pts, both athletes competing only for the Canadian Junior Championships.

References

External links
Official website for 2009 edition

2019
 
Decathlon
Combined events competitions
Recurring sporting events established in 2005
Combined Events